The Institute of Industrial Electronics Engineering (IIEE) is a public college located in Karachi, Sindh, Pakistan. It is the first and only institution in Pakistan and the second in South Asia to offer a bachelor's degree in industrial electronics engineering.

See also
 List of engineering universities and colleges in Pakistan

References

External links
 IIEE official site

Universities and colleges in Karachi
Engineering universities and colleges in Pakistan
Educational institutions established in 1989
1989 establishments in Pakistan